Robert Elias Williams (April 27, 1884 – August 6, 1962) was an American baseball player who was a catcher with the New York Highlanders/Yankees in the American League. He was released by the Yankees in 1913 to the Rochester Club of the International League.

References

External links

 Bob Williams at Flickr

Major League Baseball catchers
New York Highlanders players
New York Yankees players
Baseball players from Ohio
1884 births
1962 deaths
Minor league baseball managers
Newark Newks players
Pueblo Indians players
Canton Deubers players
Rochester Hustlers players
People from Hocking County, Ohio